Yaw Fosu-Amoah (born 8 October 1981 in Ghana) is a retired South African long jumper.

His personal best jump is 7.95 metres, achieved in the qualifying round at the 2006 Commonwealth Games.

Competition record

References

1981 births
Living people
South African male long jumpers
Ghanaian emigrants to South Africa
Athletes (track and field) at the 2006 Commonwealth Games
Commonwealth Games competitors for South Africa
Competitors at the 2005 Summer Universiade
Competitors at the 2009 Summer Universiade
Athletes (track and field) at the 2007 All-Africa Games
African Games competitors for South Africa
21st-century South African people
20th-century South African people